Narayana is one of the forms and epithets of Vishnu. In this form, the deity is depicted in yogic slumber under the celestial waters, symbolising the masculine principle and associated with his role of creation. He is also known as Purushottama, and is considered the Supreme Being in Vaishnavism.

Etymology 
L. B. Keny proposes that Narayana was associated with the Dravidian, and ultimately, the Indus Valley Civilisation, prior to his syncretism with Vishnu. To this end, he states that the etymology of the deity is associated with the Dravidian nara, meaning ‘water’, ay, which in Tamil means "to lie in a place", and an, which is the masculine termination in Dravidian languages. He asserts that this is also the reason why Narayana is represented as lying on a serpent in the sea. He quotes, "This Nārāyana of the Āryan pantheon seems to be the supreme being of the Mohenjo-Darians, a god who was probably styled Ān, a name still kept in Tamil literature as Āndivanam, the prototype of the historic Siva".

Narayan Aiyangar states the meaning of the Sanskrit word 'Narayana' can be traced back to the Laws of Manu (also known as the Manusmriti, a Dharmaśāstra text), which states:

This definition is used throughout Vedic literature such as the Mahabharata and Vishnu Purana. 'Narayana' is also defined as the 'son of the primeval man', and 'Supreme Being who is the foundation of all men'.

'Nara' (Sanskrit नार) means 'water' and 'man'
'Yana' (Sanskrit यान) means 'vehicle', 'vessel', or more loosely, 'abode' or 'home'

Description

In the Vedas and Puranas, Narayana is described as having the divine blackish-blue color of water-filled clouds, four-armed, holding a Padma (lotus), Kaumodaki (mace), Panchajanya shankha (conch), and the Sudarshana Chakra (discus).

Hinduism 

As stated in the epic Itihāsa, the Mahabharata:

As per texts like the Vishnu Purana, Bhagavata Purana, Garuda Purana, and the Padma Purana, Narayana is Vishnu himself who incarnates in various avatars.

According to the Bhagavad Gita, he is also the "Guru of the Universe". The Bhagavata Purana declares Narayana as the Supreme Personality of Godhead, who engages in the creation of 14 worlds within the universe Brahma who is Deity of rajas-guna, himself sustains, maintains and preserves the universe as Vishnu by accepting sattva-guna. Narayana himself annihilates the universe at the end of Maha-Kalpa as Kalagni Rudra who is presiding deity of tamas-guna.

According to the Bhagavata Purana, Purusha Sukta, Narayana Sukta, and Narayana Upanishad from the Vedas, he is the ultimate soul.

According to Madhvacharya, Narayana is one of the five vyuhas of Vishnu, which are cosmic emanations of God in contrast to his incarnate avatars. Madhvacharya separates Vishnu's manifestations into two groups: Vishnu's vyuhas (emanations) and His avataras (incarnations). The Vyuhas have their basis in the Pancharatras, a sectarian text that was accepted as authoritative by both the Vishishtadvaita and Dvaita schools of Vedanta. They are mechanisms by which the universe is ordered, was created, and evolves. Narayana possesses the chatur-vyuha aspects of Vasudeva, Sankarshana, Pradyumna, and Aniruddha, who evolve one after the other in the development of the universe.In the Mahabharata, Krishna is also synonymous with Narayana and Arjuna is referred to as Nara. The epic identifies them both in plural 'Krishnas', or as part incarnations of the earlier incarnations of Vishnu, recalling their mystical identity as Nara-Narayana.

Narayana is also described in the Bhagavad Gita as having a universal form (Vishvarupa) which is beyond the ordinary limits of human perception or imagination.

In the Narayana Sukta, Narayana is essentially the supreme force and/or essence of all: 'Nārāyaṇa parabrahman tatvam Nārāyaṇa paraha'. 

Narayana's eternal and supreme abode beyond the material universe is Vaikuntha which is a realm of bliss and happiness called Paramapadha, which means final or highest place for liberated souls, where they enjoy bliss and happiness for eternity in the company of the supreme lord. Vaikuntha is situated beyond the material universe and hence, cannot be perceived or measured by material science or logic. Sometimes, Ksheera Sagara where Narayana or Vishnu rests on Ananta Shesha is also perceived as Vaikuntha within the material universe.

The Śruti texts mention Narayana as the primordial being , who was present even when Brahma and Ishana (Shiva) were not present. Thus, He is the Supreme Soul.

Buddhism
The Mahāsamaya Sutta (DN 20) of the Pali Canon mentions a deity by the name Veṇhu (Sanskrit: Viṣṇu), though the text suggests that this name may also signify a class of deva. He also appears in the Veṇḍu Sutta (SN 2.12) as Veṇḍu where he addresses Gautama Buddha by celebrating the joy experienced by those who follow the Dhamma. He also makes brief mention of Manu.

Mahayana Buddhism elaborates on the character of this deity, where is often called Nārāyaṇa or more rarely, Narasiṃha and Vāsudeva. Literature often depicts him as a Vajradhara. He is present in the Womb Realm Mandala and is among the twelve guardian devas of the Diamond Realm Mandala. He is associated with Śrāvaṇa in esoteric astrology. His queen consort is Nārāyaṇī. He is said to have been born from Avalokiteśvara's heart. The Buddhas are sometimes described as having a firm body like Nārāyaṇa.

The Yogācārabhūmi Śāstra describes him as having three faces with a greenish-yellow complexion. He holds a wheel in his right hand and rides upon a garuḍa. Chapter 6 of the Yiqiejing Yinyi explains that he belongs to the Kāmadhātu and is veneration for the acquisition of power. Chapter 41 adds that he has eight arms that wield various "Dharma weapons" (dharmayuda) with which he subjugates the asuras.

He appears as an interlocutor in several Mahayana sutras, including the Kāraṇḍavyūha Sūtra, Sarvapuṇyasamuccayasamādhi Sūtra and the Nārāyaṇaparipṛcchā Dhāraṇī.

He is also mentioned in several places in the Lalitavistara Sūtra, one of the Sutras that describe the life of Gautama Buddha. It is said that The Buddha "is endowed with the great strength of Nārāyaṇa, he is called the great Nārāyaṇa himself."

Jainism 

Balabhadra and Narayana are mighty half brothers, who appear nine times in each half of the time cycles of the Jain cosmology and jointly rule half the earth as half-chakravarti. Ultimately Prati-naryana is killed by Narayana for his unrighteousness and immorality. Narayana are extremely powerful and are as powerful as 2 Balabhadras. Chakravartins are as powerful as 2 Narayanas. Hence Narayanas become half-chakravartins. Tirthankaras are much more powerful than Chakravartins. In Jain Mahabharta, there is a friendly duel between cousin brothers Neminatha (Tirthankara) and Krishna (Naryana) in which Neminath defeats Krishna without any effort at all. There is also a story of Neminath lifting Conch of Krishna and blowing it without any effort. In Jain Mahabharat, the main fight between Krishna and Jarasandha is described, who is killed by Krishna.

Literature

Narayana is hailed in certain parts of Vedas like the Narayana Suktam and Vishnu Suktam. He Narayana is also hailed in selective Vaishnava Upanishads like the Narayana Upanishad, Maha Narayana Upanishad, and the Narasimha Tapani Upanishad.

The Padma Purana relates an episode where Narayana grants Rudra (Shiva) a boon. The destroyer deity seeks two boons. Firstly, he wishes to be the greatest of the devotees of Narayana, as well as bearing the reputation of the same throughout the world. Secondly, he desires the ability to offer salvation to whoever seeks refuge in him.

The prowess of Narayana is described in the Ramayana:

Ramanuja's prayer of surrender to Narayana in the Sharanagati Gadya of the Tiruvaymoli was and is significant to his Sri Vaishnava adherents, as it became a model prayer for future generations. In this prayer, Ramanuja describes Narayana to be the "beloved consort of Sri and of Bhumi and NIla". He is stated to reside in his abode of Vaikuntha, where he assumes the role of the creation, preservation, as well as the destruction of the universe. Narayana is extolled to be the same as the Ultimate Reality, Brahman. He is regarded to be the refuge of all creation, the master of spiritual as well as material entities, as well as the dispeller of the miseries of his devotees. He ends his prayer by saluting Narayana and his consort Sri, to whom he surrenders to his "lotus-like feet".

See also

Adam Kadmon
Bhagavan
Bhakti
Garbhodaksayi Vishnu
Hari
Hiranyagarbha
Jagannath
Kshirodakasayi Vishnu
Mahavishnu
Narayana sukta
Pangu
Parabrahman
Paramatma
Pausha
Ranganatha
Sankarshana
Vaikunta
Vishnu
World egg
Salakapurusa

References

External links

 Name of Narayana even at the time of death can save a great sinner, Ajamila.
 http://www.ayurvedacollege.com/articles/drhalpern/om_namo_narayanaya Om Namo Narayana and Ayurveda

Forms of Vishnu
Hindu gods

ja:那羅延天
Names of Vishnu